Jack Allison (born February 18, 1986) is an American writer, podcaster, and comedian. He is the co-host of Struggle Session with Leslie Lee III, and JackAM with Cait Raft. He is best known for writing for Jimmy Kimmel Live! and feuding with Michael Che and other current writers of Saturday Night Live. He is also a member of the Upright Citizens Brigade.

References

Living people
American comedy writers
1986 births